John Kemeny (1925 - 2012) was a Hungarian-Canadian film producer whom the Toronto Star called "the forgotten giant of Canadian film history and...the most successful producer in Canadian history." His production credits include The Apprenticeship of Duddy Kravitz, Atlantic City, and Quest for Fire.

Early career
John Kemeny was born in Budapest and, at a young age, forged a career in the film business, working in distribution and promotion. Following the Hungarian Revolution of 1956, he moved to Montreal where, in 1959, he was hired by the National Film Board of Canada (NFB). He began as an editor, then moved to directing but it was evident that his talent lay in producing. While at the NFB, he edited, wrote, directed and/or produced 100 films, including Memorandum, Ladies and Gentlemen... Mr. Leonard Cohen, The Things I Cannot Change, The Best Damn Fiddler from Calabogie to Kaladar and Don't Let the Angels Fall.

International Cinemedia Center 
In 1971, Kemeny left the NFB, along with three NFB colleagues: Joe Koenig, George Kaczender and Don Duprey. They formed International Cinemedia Center Productions (ICC), with the aim of producing documentaries and educational films. In 1973, the prominent director Ted Kotcheff returned to Montreal from London and, with his friend Mordecai Richler, starting developing the film version of Richler’s book The Apprenticeship of Duddy Kravitz. Kemeny had the reputation of being a calm, precise and budget-conscious producer and the deal was struck for ICC to produce the film. It was a massive success. The Apprenticeship of Duddy Kravitz grossed $1.7 million, won several awards and was ranked, by the Toronto International Film Festival, in the Top 10 Canadian Films of All Time.<ref>"Top 10 Canadian Films of All Time", The Canadian Encyclopedia, 2012, URL accessed 28 April 2013.</ref>

The success of Duddy Kravitz led to a three-picture deal with Columbia Pictures. Kemeny produced Ice Castles, Shadow of the Hawk and White Line Fever; Ice Castles was a  success; White Line Fever grossed $35 million on a $1.4 million budget.

International Cinema Inc.
In 1978, Don Duprey returned to the NFB and Joe Koenig left the group to form Interactive Image Technologies (which would become Electronics Workbench). Kemeny was joined by his friend, the Quebec filmmaker Denis Héroux, and ICC became International Cinema Inc. The company produced eleven films in six years, most notably Atlantic City and Quest for Fire.

Alliance Entertainment
In 1984, Kemeny and Héroux merged International Cinema with RSL Entertainment, the company of producers Stephen J. Roth, Andras Hamori, Susan Cavan and Robert Lantos, to form Alliance Entertainment. The company saw immediate and stunning success, producing at least six projects a year, including features, TV movies and series (in 1998, it became Alliance Atlantis Communications). Perhaps because of the pace, Kemeny left Alliance in 1991. He had already produced several films for HBO and would produce three more, including The Josephine Baker Story, before retiring in 1997.

Personal life and death
Kemeny was married three times; the last to Margaret who he married in 1964. Kemeny retired in 1996. He and Margaret, who was also Hungarian, returned to Europe, dividing their time between homes in Hungary and Spain. With the increasingly-unpleasant political situation in Hungary, and the desire for a warm climate, they bought a house in Sedona, Arizona. Kemeny was a citizen of Hungary and Canada, and his Green card had lapsed; from Spain, they waged a stressful two-year legal battle to be permitted to live in the US. In September of 2012, they were allowed to return. Two weeks after their arrival, Kemeny was diagnosed with cancer. He died one month later, on November 23, at age 87. He was pre-deceased by a daughter and was survived by his wife and one son.

Legacy
At the 12th Genie Awards in 1991, the Academy of Canadian Cinema & Television awarded Kemeny the Special Achievement Genie in recognition of his contribution to the Canadian film industry. 

Upon his death, Robert Lantos told the Toronto Star: "John was a producer of extraordinary accomplishments. Because he never promoted himself, preferring to stay in the shadow, few in the Canadian industry today know who he is. By the time he retired 15 years ago, he had accomplished more than any other Canadian producer - ever. Five Oscar nominations for Atlantic City including Best Picture (still the only Canadian film ever nominated in this), and the Golden Lion in Venice. An Oscar nomination and the Golden Bear in Berlin for Duddy Kravitz. The César (French Oscar) for best picture and an Oscar nomination for Quest For Fire. No other Canadian film has ever won either the top Berlin or the top Venice prize. He won them both, as well as a multitude of Genie Awards for these and for other films like The Bay Boy. He made some of the most distinguished HBO movies ever, such as Murderers Among Us: The Simon Wiesenthal Story, and The Josephine Baker Story, which was nominated for twelve Emmy Awards and won five. He also made major commercial hits for Hollywood Studios, such as Ice Castles and White Line Fever. He was a pioneer and a perfectionist and a founding partner of Alliance. Homage should be paid."

Filmography

National Film Board of Canada

The Inquiring Mind - documentary short, David Bairstow 1959 - editor
Dykes for Dry Land - documentary short, Donald Wilder 1959 - editor
Grassland Farming - documentary short, Donald Wilder 1959 - editor
On Prescription Only - documentary short, Julian Biggs 1960 - editor
Men Against the Ice - documentary short, David Bairstow 1960 - editor
Steering North - documentary short, David Bairstow 1960 - editor
Cash Advances for Prairie Grain - documentary short, Ernest Reid 1961 - editor
Everybody’s Prejudiced - documentary short, Donald Brittain 1961 - editor
Henry Larsen’s Northwest Passages - documentary short, David Bairstow 1962 - editor
The Boy Next Door - short film, Ernest Reid 1962 - editor
What Farm Price Support Means to You - documentary short, Ernest Reid 1962 - editor
Canada at War: Days of Infamy - documentary short, Donald Brittain, Peter Jones & Stanley Clish 1962 - editor
Canada at War: Turn of the Tide - documentary short, Donald Brittain, Peter Jones & Stanley Clish 1962 - editor
Canada at War: Road to Ortona - documentary short, Donald Brittain & Stanley Clish 1962 - editor
Canada at War: New Directions - documentary short, Donald Brittain & Stanley Clish 1962 - editor
Canada at War: Crisis on the Hill - documentary short, Donald Brittain & Stanley Clish 1962 - editor
Canada at War: The Clouded Dawn - documentary short, Donald Brittain & Stanley Clish 1962 - editor
Canada at War: Dusk - documentary short, Donald Brittain & Stanley Clish 1962 - editor
Drylanders - documentary short, Don Haldane 1963 - editor
The Early Journeys of Vilhjalmur Stefansson - documentary short, David Bairstow 1963 - editor
The Later Journeys of Vilhjalmur Stefansson - documentary short, David Bairstow 1963 - editor
Memories and Predictions - documentary short, David Bairstow 1963 - editor
Wedding Day - documentary short, Julian Biggs, Hector Lemieux & John Howe 1963 - editor
Three Grandmothers - documentary short, Julian Biggs & John Howe 1963 - editor
Bethune - documentary, Donald Brittain 1964 - writer, editor, producer 
Three Country Boys - documentary short 1964 - co-director 
Three Fishermen - documentary short 1964 - co-director 
The Visit - documentary short 1964 – director 
Stefansson: The Arctic Prophet - documentary short 1965 - director and producer
Henry Larsen - documentary short 1965 - director and producer
Ladies and Gentlemen... Mr. Leonard Cohen - documentary, Donald Brittain & Don Owen 1965 - producer 
Miner - documentary short, Robin Spry 1965 - producer 
Two Men of Montreal - documentary, Suzanne Angel, Donald Brittain & Don Owen 1965 - producer 
You're No Good - short film, George Kaczender 1965 - producer
Level 4350 - documentary short, Robin Spry 1965 - producer
Little White Crimes - short film, George Kaczender 1966 - producer
No Reason to Stay - short film, Mort Ransen 1966 - producer 
The Long Haul Men - documentary short, Michael Rubbo 1966 - producer 
The Merry-Go-Round - documentary short, Tanya Ballantyne & Tanya Tree 1966 - producer 
Trawler Fishermen - documentary short, Martin Defalco 1966 - producer 
The Game - short film, George Kaczender 1966 - producer 
Pikangikum - documentary short, John Gould 1967 - producer
Andrew Britt at Shoal Bay - documentary short, Colin Low 1967 - producer 
Indian Dialogue - documentary short, David Hughes 1967 - producer
A Wedding and Party - documentary short, Colin Low 1967 - producer 
A Woman’s Place - documentary short, Colin Low 1967 - producer 
Fishermen’s Meeting - documentary short, Colin Low 1967 - producer 
Fogo’s Expatriates - documentary short, Colin Low 1967 - producer 
Billy Crane Moves Away - documentary short, Colin Low 1967 - producer 
Brian Earle on Merchants and Welfare - documentary short, Colin Low 1967 - producer 
Citizen Discussions - documentary short, Colin Low 1967 - producer 
Dan Roberts on Fishing - documentary short, Colin Low 1967 - producer 
Jim Decker Builds a Longliner - documentary short, Colin Low 1967 - producer 
Jim Decker’s Party - documentary short, Colin Low 1967 - producer 
Joe Kinsella on Education - documentary short, Colin Low 1967 - producer 
McGraths at Home and Fishing - documentary short, Colin Low 1967 - producer 
Encounter at Kwacha House - Halifax - documentary short, Rex Tasker 1967 - producer 
Encounter with Saul Alinsky - Part 1: CYC Toronto - documentary short, Peter Pearson 1967 - producer 
Encounter with Saul Alinsky - Part 2: Rama Indian Reserve - documentary short, Peter Pearson 1967 - producer 
Indian Relocation - Elliot Lake: A Report - documentary short, David Hughes & D'Arcy Marsh 1967 - producer 
Madawaska Valley - documentary short, John Ormond 1967 - producer 
Ride for Your Life - documentary short, Robin Spry 1967 - producer 
Sabre and Foil - documentary short, George Kaczender 1967 - producer 
The Children of Fogo Island - documentary short, Colin Low 1967 - producer 
Some Problems of Fogo - documentary short, Colin Low 1967 - producer 
Discussion on Welfare - documentary short, Colin Low 1967 - producer 
The Fogo Island Improvement Committee - documentary short, Colin Low 1967 - producer 
The Founding of the Co-operatives - documentary short, Colin Low 1967 - producer 
The Mercer Family - documentary short, Colin Low 1967 - producer 
The Merchant and the Teacher - documentary short, Colin Low 1967 - producer 
The Songs of Chris Cobb - documentary short, Colin Low 1967 - producer 
The Story of the Up Top - documentary short, Colin Low 1967 - producer 
Thoughts on Fogo and Norway - documentary short, Colin Low 1967 - producer 
Tom Best on Co-operatives - documentary short, Colin Low 1967 - producer 
Two Cabinet Ministers - documentary short, Colin Low 1967 - producer 
William Wells Talks About the Island - documentary short, Colin Low 1967 - producer 
The Halifax Neighbourhood Center Project - documentary short, Rex Tasker 1967 - producer 
The Things I Cannot Change - documentary, Tanya Ballantyne 1967 - producer 
Memorandum - documentary, Donald Brittain & John Spotton 1967 - producer 
The Circle - documentary, Mort Ransen 1967 - producer 
A Continuing Responsibility - documentary short, Bonnie Sherr Klein 1968 - producer 
Introduction to Fogo Island - documentary short, Colin Low 1968 - producer 
Building an Organization - documentary short, Peter Pearson & Bonnie Sherr Klein 1968 - producer 
People and Power - documentary short, Bonnie Sherr Klein 1968 - producer
Deciding to Organize - documentary short, Peter Pearson & Bonnie Sherr Klein 1968 - producer 
Through Conflict to Negotiation - documentary short, Bonnie Sherr Klein 1968 - producer
Saul Alinsky Went to War - documentary, Donald Brittain 1968 - producer 
The Best Damn Fiddler from Calabogie to Kaladar - short film, Peter Pearson 1968 - producer 
Don't Let the Angels Fall - feature, George Kaczender 1968 - producer 
Falling from Ladders - documentary short, Mort Ransen 1969 - producer 
Passing Through Sweden - documentary short, Martin Duckworth 1969 - producer 
The Land - documentary short, Rex Tasker & Jean-Claude Labrecque 1969 - producer 
A Place for Everything - documentary short, Eric M. Nilsson 1970 - producer 
Overspill - documentary short, Mort Ransen 1970 - producer 
The Burden They Carry - documentary short, Mort Ransen 1970 - producer 
The City: Osaka - animated short film, Kaj Pindal 1970 - producer 
Untouched and Pure - documentary, Christopher Cordeaux, Mort Ransen & Martin Duckworth 1970 - producer
Canada the Land - documentary short, Rex Tasker & Jean-Claude Labrecque 1971 - producer 
7 fois... par jour - feature, Denis Héroux 1971 - producer (independent)International Cinemedia Center ProductionsMarxism: The Theory That Split the World - documentary short, George Kaczender 1970 - producer 
Freud: The Hidden Nature of Man - documentary short, George Kaczender 1970 – producer
Newton: The Mind That Found the Future - documentary short, George Kaczender 1970 – producer
Two Grasslands: Texas and Iran - documentary short, George Kaczender 1970 - producer
Food: The Story of a Peanut Butter Sandwich - documentary short, George Kaczender 1970 – producer
Top of the World: Taiga, Tundra, Ice Cap - documentary short, George Kaczender 1971 - producer
Brown Wolf - short film, George Kaczender 1972 - producer
 The Apprenticeship of Duddy Kravitz - feature, Ted Kotcheff 1974 - producer
White Line Fever - feature, Jonathan Kaplan 1975 – producer
Medieval Myths and Medicine - documentary short, George Kaczender 1975 - producer
Evolution of the Appalachians - animated film, (for the NFB) 1976 - producer 
Volcanism: Eruption of Kilauea, Hawaii - short film, 1976 - producer 
Shadow of the Hawk - feature, George McCowan 1976 - producer
Ice Castles - feature, Donald Wrye 1979 - producerInternational Cinema Inc.Atlantic City - feature, Louis Malle 1980 - producer
Quest for Fire - feature, Jean-Jacques Annaud 1981 - producer
The Plouffe Family - feature, Gilles Carle 1981 - producer
The Crime of Ovide Plouffe - mini-series, Denys Arcand & Gilles Carle 1984 - producer
The Bay Boy - feature, Daniel Petrie 1984 - producer
The Blood of Others - feature, Claude Chabrol 1984 - producer
Louisiana - TV movie, Philippe de Broca 1984 - producer
The Alley Cat (aka Le matou) - feature, Jean Beaudin 1985 - producer
The Park Is Mine - TV movie, Steven Hilliard Stern 1985 - producer
Jayce and the Wheeled Warriors - TV series, 65 episodes, 1985 - producer
The Boy in Blue - feature, Charles Jarrott 1986 - producerAlliance EntertainmentSword of Gideon - feature, Michael Anderson 1986 - executive producer
The Wraith - feature, Mike Marvin 1986 - executive producer
Nowhere to Hide - feature, Mario Philip Azzopardi 1987 - producer 
Iron Eagle II - feature, Sidney J. Furie 1988 - producer 
The Gate - feature, Tibor Takács 1987 - executive producer
The Gate II: Trespassers - feature, Tibor Takács 1990 - executive producer 
Hungarian Requiem - feature, Károly Makk 1991 - producerHBO'''Red King, White Knight - TV Movie, Geoff Murphy 1989 - producer Murderers Among Us: The Simon Wiesenthal Story - feature, Brian Gibson 1989 - producerThe Josephine Baker Story - TV movie, Brian Gibson 1991 - producer Teamster Boss: The Jackie Presser Story - TV movie, Alastair Reid 1992 - producer Dead Silence - TV movie, Daniel Petrie Jr. 1997 - producerWhen Trumpets Fade - TV movie, John Irvin 1998 – producer

Awards
(List excludes awards in the directing, acting and/or craft categories)Bethune (1964) 
 International Festival for Documentary and Animated Film, Leipzig, Germany: First Prize, TV, 1965
 International Festival of Red Cross and Health Films, Sofia, Bulgaria: Gold Medal, 1967
 Edinburgh International Film Festival, Edinburgh, Scotland: Diploma of Honour, 1965
 Melbourne International Film Festival, Melbourne: Diploma of Merit, 1966
 Salerno Film Festival, Salerno, Italy: Second Prize, 1968Ladies and Gentlemen... Mr. Leonard Cohen (1965)
 18th Canadian Film Awards, Montreal: Genie Award for Best Film, TV Information, 1966
 American Film and Video Festival, New York: Blue Ribbon, Literature, 1966
 International Festival of Short Films, Philadelphia: Award for Exceptional Merit, 1968No Reason to Stay (1966) 
 American Film and Video Festival, New York: Blue Ribbon, Personal Guidance, 1967
 Columbus International Film & Animation Festival, Columbus, Ohio: Chris Award, Education & Information, 1967
 La Plata International Children's Film Festival, La Plata, Argentina: Best Film of the Festival - Gold Plaque, 1968
 Annual Landers Associates Awards, New York: Award of Merit, 1966
 Melbourne International Film Festival, Melbourne: Diploma of Merit, 1967
 International Exhibition of Scientific Film, Buenos Aires: Diploma of Honour, 1968The Things I Cannot Change (1967) 
 Golden Gate International Film Festival, San Francisco: Award for Excellence in Network Presentation, 1967
 International Short Film Festival Oberhausen, Oberhausen, Germany: Diploma of Merit, 1968
 Montreal International Film Festival, Montreal: Special Mention Mention, Medium-Length Films, 1967
 Conference on Children, Washington, DC: Certificate of Merit, 1970
 21st British Academy Film Awards, London: Nominee: BAFTA Award for Best Documentary, 1968Memorandum (1967)  
 Venice Film Festival, Venice: First Prize, Lion of St. Mark, 1966
 Golden Gate International Film Festival, San Francisco: First Prize, Essay, 1966
 Vancouver International Film Festival, Vancouver: Certificate of Merit, Television Films, 1966
 Montreal International Film Festival, Montreal: Special Mention, Medium-Length Films, 1966The Children of Fogo Island (1967) 
 Conference on Children, Washington, DC: Certificate of Merit, 1970Sabre and Foil (1967) 
 International Sports Film Festival, Cortina d'Ampezzo, Italy: Silver Medal, 1969Ride for Your Life (1967) 
 International Short Film Festival Oberhausen, Oberhausen, Germany: Best in Category, 1968
 Melnik Automobile Club Festival, Prague: First Prize, 1969Don't Let the Angels Fall (1968) 
 Film Critics and Journalists Association of Ceylon, Colombo, Sri Lanka: Best Foreign Feature Film, 1971The Best Damn Fiddler from Calabogie to Kaladar (1968)
 21st Canadian Film Awards, Toronto: Genie Award for Film of the Year, 1969
 21st Canadian Film Awards, Toronto: Genie Award for Best TV Drama, 1969
 Melbourne International Film Festival, Melbourne: Diploma of Merit, 1970Saul Alinsky Went to War (1968) 
 Columbus International Film & Animation Festival, Columbus, Ohio: Chris Award, 1970Falling from Ladders (1969) 
 International Festival of Short Films, Philadelphia: Award for Exceptional Merit, 1971Untouched and Pure (1970)
 Chicago International Film Festival, Chicago: Silver Hugo, Education, 1970Canada the Land (1971) 
 International Festival of Tourism Films, Palma de Mallorca, Spain: Silver Bull Award, 1973
 International Festival of Sports and Tourist Films, Kranj, Yugoslavia: Diploma of Merit, 1972The Apprenticeship of Duddy Kravitz (1974) 
 Berlin International Film Festival, Berlin: Golden Bear, Best Film, 1974
 26th Canadian Film Awards, Niagara-on-the-Lake, ON: Film of the Year, 1974
 32nd Golden Globe Awards, Los Angeles: Nominee, Best Foreign Film, 1975Atlantic City (1980)
 Venice Film Festival, Venice, Italy: Golden Lion, 1980
 1981 National Society of Film Critics Awards, New York: Best Picture, 1981
 Los Angeles Film Critics Association Awards, Los Angeles: Best Picture, 1981 
 Fotogramas de Plata, Madrid: Best Foreign Film, 1982
 Sant Jordi Awards, Barcelona: Best Foreign Film, 1982
 National Board of Review: Top Ten Films, Second Place, 1981
 39th Golden Globe Awards, Los Angeles: Nominee, Best Foreign Film, 1982
 1981 New York Film Critics Circle Awards, New York: Nominee: Best Film, 1981
 35th British Academy Film Awards, London: Nominee: BAFTA Award for Best Film, 1982
 54th Academy Awards, Los Angeles: Nominee: Best Picture, 1982
 National Film Preservation Board, National Film Registry Induction, 2003Quest for Fire (1980)
 7th César Awards, Paris: Best Film, 1982
 9th Saturn Awards, Los Angeles, Best International Film, 1982
 9th Saturn Awards, Los Angeles, Award for Outstanding Film, 1982
 4th Genie Awards, Toronto: Nominee: Best Motion Picture, 1983
 40th Golden Globe Awards, Los Angeles: Nominee: Best Foreign Film, 1983The Plouffe Family (1981)
 Montreal World Film Festival, Montreal: Best Canadian Film, 1981 
 3rd Genie Awards, Toronto: Nominee: Best Motion Picture, 1982The Bay Boy (1984)
 6th Genie Awards, Toronto: Best Motion Picture, 1985The Alley Cat (1985)
 Montreal World Film Festival, Montreal: Jury Prize, 1985 
 Montreal World Film Festival, Montreal: Most Popular Film of the Festival, 1985 
 7th Genie Awards, Toronto: Nominee: Best Motion Picture, 1986The Gate (1987)
 9th Genie Awards, Toronto: Golden Reel Award, 1988Murderers Among Us: The Simon Wiesenthal Story (1989)
 CableACE Award: Best Movie or Miniseries, 1990
 5th TCA Awards, Los Angeles: Nominee: Program of the Year, 1989
 41st Primetime Emmy Awards, Los Angeles: Nominee: Outstanding Drama or Comedy Special, 1989The Josephine Baker Story'' (1991)
 CableACE Award: Nominee: Best Movie or Miniseries, 1992
 49th Golden Globe Awards, Los Angeles: Nominee: Best Mini-Series or Television Movie, 1992
 43rd Primetime Emmy Awards, Los Angeles: Nominee: Outstanding Drama/Comedy Special and Miniseries, 1991

References

External links
 

1925 births
2012 deaths
Film producers from Quebec
Hungarian emigrants to Canada
People from Montreal
People from Sedona, Arizona
Film people from Budapest
Canadian documentary film producers
National Film Board of Canada people
Deaths from cancer in Arizona
Canadian film production company founders